Talparo is a rural community in the Republic of Trinidad and Tobago.  It is located in west-central Trinidad, and is administered by the Couva–Tabaquite–Talparo Regional Corporation.

Religion 
Talparo, is A mainly Roman Catholic Village in the East of Trinidad (Trinidad and Tobago).

Its Roman Catholic dominated population usually hold and attend church services on Sundays and observe Saturday as the Holy Sabbath.

Entertainment 
For entertainment in this small village, people usually attend and host parties.

There is also a park in this tiny village.

The folk in this village believe in the folklore of the Douen.

There is also an annual village fest held in the community centre

References 

Populated places in Trinidad and Tobago